St. Henri (also known as St. Henry, St-Henri, Saint-Henri and Saint-Jacques) was a federal electoral district in Quebec, Canada, that was represented in the House of Commons of Canada from 1925 to 1988.

This riding was created in 1924 as "St. Henri" riding from parts of Westmount—St. Henri. In 1933, its English name was changed to "St. Henry".  In 1947, "St. Henry" was abolished when it was redistributed into "St-Henri" and St. Antoine—Westmount ridings.

In 1952, "St-Henri" was abolished, and its territory transferred into a new riding named "Saint-Henri".  In 1977, it was renamed Saint-Jacques.

Following the 2003 redistribution, the area of the old St-Henri riding is now part of the riding of Jeanne-Le Ber.

Members of Parliament

This riding elected the following Members of Parliament:

Election results

St. Henri, 1925–1935

St. Henry, 1935–1949

|Anti-Conscriptionist
|Louis-Gérard Gosselin
|align=right|642

St-Henri, 1949–1953

Saint-Henri, 1953–1979

Saint-Jacques, 1979–1988

See also 

 List of Canadian federal electoral districts
 Past Canadian electoral districts

External links 

Riding history from the Library of Parliament:
St. Henri (1924 - 1933)
St. Henry (1933 - 1947)
St-Henri (1947 - 1952)
Saint-Henri (1952 - 1977)
Saint-Jacques (1977 - 1987)

Former federal electoral districts of Quebec